Jennifer Fry (born 24 March 1989) is a South African badminton player. She was a 2015 All-Africa Games gold medalist in the mixed doubles event, also won the silver medal in the mixed team event. In 2017, she claimed two gold medals at the 2017 African Championships, won the title in the women's and mixed doubles event.

Achievements

All-Africa Games 
Mixed doubles

African Championships 
Women's doubles

Mixed doubles

BWF International Challenge/Series 
Women's doubles

Mixed doubles

  BWF International Challenge tournament
  BWF International Series tournament
  BWF Future Series tournament

References

External links 
 
 
 

1989 births
Living people
Sportspeople from Pretoria
South African female badminton players
Badminton players at the 2014 Commonwealth Games
Commonwealth Games competitors for South Africa
Competitors at the 2015 African Games
African Games gold medalists for South Africa
African Games silver medalists for South Africa
African Games medalists in badminton
21st-century South African women